Yevgeny Nikolaevich Petrov (born December 17, 1975), known as The Novouralsk Ripper, is a Russian serial killer, rapist and pedophile.

Biography 
In 1992, Petrov was conditionally sentenced for stealing a computer. While serving in the army, he almost killed his commander, but the case was concealed by the military prosecutor's office itself. He graduated from a vocational school with the specialty of a fitter, and worked as a combine operator with his father.

He had a common-law marriage and a small son. Petrov did not smoke and drink, and generally led a normal lifestyle. He also loved motor sports.

In 1998, a schoolgirl named Maria Polivtseva went missing. She was on a visit to relatives alone, but never arrived at their home.

In 1999, another schoolgirl who was visiting her grandmother disappeared briefly after leaving the house. In the same year, another girl went missing while walking around with her parents at the city pond. And again in the same year, two more girls went missing as well.

In 2000, right in the middle of the day, a 14-year-old girl was kidnapped in front of her younger sister. The man wanted to take both girls away, but the younger girl managed to escape.

The investigation suggested that the girls were taken into sexual slavery, which meant that there was a chance of finding them alive. Soon, a local artist reported a suspicious man who was a carrying a child with him, and drew his portrait. The investigation was skidding, and the situation in the city was getting heated. Authorities did not want to recognize the existence of a serial killer, and therefore security measures were not taken in the city. But soon after, five half-burned and dismembered bodies of missing girls were found in a nearby forest (the sixth body was found later), all of them raped before being killed.

Suddenly, the murders stopped. It was suggested that the criminal was imprisoned, and all prisoners in the area were examined.

But in 2003, at the gates of a children's camp, a female volleyball player was kidnapped. Local fishermen soon found her mutilated corpse in the river. The investigators soon learned that just before the murder, a young man was seen driving a car and suggested to local schoolgirls to take a ride with him. To one of them, he revealed that his name was "Petrov". Soon after, Yevgeny Petrov was arrested, and under the weight of the evidence, he confessed to 11 murders.

Petrov said that he caught girls on the roads, forced them into his car and then drove them to a secluded spot where he would rape, kill, dismember and burn them afterwards. In an interview with journalists he admitted his guilt, but expressed no remorse. Two additional cases were also revealed, in which Petrov's victims actually managed to survive. In 2005, the court sentenced him to life imprisonment.

While in prison, Petrov tried several times to commit suicide in his cell. The parents of his victims demanded the death penalty, and the father of one of them offered that Petrov be extradited to them.

In the media 
 The documentary film "Sinister Triangle", hosted by Eduard Petrov from the series "Honest Detective", is based on Yevgeny Petrov's case.

See also
 List of Russian serial killers
 List of serial killers by number of victims

References

External links 
 Egor Belousov: The Novoraulsk Ripper was sentenced to life imprisonment. News archive of UralPolit.ru (April 6, 2005). Accessed on June 2, 2013.

1975 births
Living people
Male serial killers
Prisoners sentenced to life imprisonment by Russia
Russian rapists
Russian serial killers